One Mile may refer to:
 The mile run
 One Mile, New South Wales
 One Mile, Queensland